Moroleón is a city located in the same name municipality of the state of Guanajuato, adjacent to the border with the state of Michoacán, in Mexico.

In 1604, Dona Juana María de Medina y Calderón was granted land in the jurisdiction of Yuririapúndaro in southern Guanajuato by 9th Viceroy of New Spain Don Gaspar de Zúñiga y Acevedo (1560-1606). Eventually, the heir to jurisdiction of Yuririapúndaro Don Jose Guzman Lopez begin settling the lands in 1775 along with several other prominent families of the area. The jurisdiction of Yuririapúndaro would be the land were Moroleón would be officially recognized by the state of Guanajuato as a municipality in 1845. The municipality of Moroleón was 1 of 46 municipalities across the state of Guanajuato that were created by a governor's Decree of Creation on November 19, 1845. In 1929, Moroleón was officially recognized as a city by decree of state of Guanajuato Governor Agustín Arroyo Ch. (1)

It lies directly west of the city of Uriangato, and is a part of the Uriangato-Moroleón metropolitan area that includes the two municipalities. The city is the seat of the municipality. In the Mexican census of 2005 the city had a population of 41,909 inhabitants, while the municipality had a population of 46,751. The municipality has an area of 164.97 km² (60.606 sq mi). Moroleon is considered an important clothes shopping destination in Guanajuato, with clothing stores that line the streets for miles as it is one of the leading cities of the textile industry in all of Mexico.  On the 16th of January, there is a big festival to celebrate the history of the church.  Also, there is another celebration on the 16 of September to recognize the independence of Mexico.

Nearby cities include Uriangato, Yuriria and Morelia.

Notable people 

 General Tomás Moreno (1800–1864)
 Jesús López López, doctor, writer, poet and politician (1888–1962)
 Arizona State Representative Cesar Chavez (born October 30, 1987)
United States Representative Salud Carbajal (born November 18, 1964)

References
Link to tables of population data from Census of 2005 INEGI: Instituto Nacional de Estadística, Geografía e Informática
entry in Enciclopedia de los Municipios de México

(1) Salgado, Agustin Martinez & Sanchez, Evangelina Gordillo. Moroleon, Sus Inicios...Y 200 Anos de Laboriosidad Compartida. Gobierno del Estado de Guanajuato. Guanajuato, Guanajuato MX. 2010.

External links

Ayuntamiento de Moroleón Official website
D MOROLEON.COM | CREANDO PUENTES Spanish
photos Moroleón

Populated places in Guanajuato
Municipalities of Guanajuato